The NRP Sagres is a tall ship and school ship of the Portuguese Navy since 1961. As the third ship with this name in the Portuguese Navy, she is sometimes referred to as Sagres III.

Design and specifications
The ship is a steel-built three masted barque, with square sails on the fore and main masts and gaff rigging on the mizzen mast.

Ship history
The three-masted ship was launched under the name Albert Leo Schlageter on 30 October 1937 at Blohm & Voss in Hamburg for Nazi Germany's Kriegsmarine. The ship was named after Albert Leo Schlageter, who was executed in 1923 by French forces occupying the Ruhr area. Her first commander was Bernhard Rogge. Sagres is a sister ship of the Gorch Fock, the Horst Wessel, and the Romanian training vessel Mircea. Another sister, Herbert Norkus, was not completed, while Gorch Fock II was built in 1958 by the Germans to replace the ships lost after the war.

Following a number of international training voyages, the ship was used as a stationary office ship after the outbreak of World War II and was only put into ocean-going service again in 1944 in the Baltic Sea. On 14 November 1944 she hit a Soviet mine off Sassnitz and had to be towed to port in Swinemünde. Eventually transferred to Flensburg, she was taken over there by the Allies when the war ended and finally confiscated by the United States.

In 1948, the U.S. sold her to Brazil for a symbolic price of $5,000 USD. She was towed to Rio de Janeiro where she sailed as a school ship for the Brazilian Navy under the name Guanabara. In 1961, Ambassador Teotónio Pereira of Portugal, who was also a man of the sea, loved sailing ships, and had been an organizer of the first Tall Ships’ Race, persevered in his mediations and the Portuguese Navy bought the Guanabara to replace the previous school ship Sagres (which was transferred to Hamburg, where she is a museum ship under her original name Rickmer Rickmers). The Portuguese Navy renamed Guanabara as Sagres (the third ship of that name), where she remains in service to this day.

In 2010, the ship performed her longest voyage, a round the world trip performing an approximate total of 35000 miles, under the command of CMG Pedro Proença Mendes. The ship left Lisbon on 19 January and returned on 24 December, having participated in Velas Sudamerica 2010, a historic Latin American tour by eleven tall ships to celebrate the bicentennial of the first national governments of Argentina and Chile. She also took part in the Expo Shanghai, among other events during that year.

The ship has sailed under the Portuguese flag since 1962. For that reason, in 2012 there were major commemorations of her 75th anniversary and 50 years in the service of the Portuguese navy.

Sister ships
Gorch Fock (ex-Tovarishch)
USCGC Eagle (ex-Horst Wessel)
Herbert Norkus, never completed
Mircea, Romanian sail training ship
Gorch Fock II

Gallery

See also 

 List of naval ships of Germany
 List of Kriegsmarine ships

References

External links
 The school ship Sagres at the Portuguese Navy website

World War II auxiliary ships of Germany
Ships built in Hamburg
Tall ships of Germany
Individual sailing vessels
1937 ships
Tall ships of Portugal
Training ships of the Portuguese Navy
Gorch Fock-class sailing ships